Sadowne  is a village in Węgrów County, Masovian Voivodeship, in east-central Poland. It is the seat of the Gmina (administrative district) called Gmina Sadowne.

References

External links
 Jewish Community in Sadowne on Virtual Shtetl

Villages in Węgrów County